Sandwithia is a plant genus of the family Euphorbiaceae first described in 1932. It is native to northern South America. It is dioecious.

Species
 Sandwithia guyanensis Lanj. - French Guiana, Guyana, Venezuela, N Brazil
 Sandwithia heterocalyx Secco - SE Colombia, S Venezuela, N Brazil

References

Aleuritideae
Euphorbiaceae genera
Flora of South America
Dioecious plants